Nicholas Monroe and Simon Stadler were the defending champions but they decided to participate in the 2013 Seguros Bolívar Open Pereira instead.
Marin Draganja and Adrián Menéndez-Maceiras defeated Marco Chiudinelli and Peter Gojowczyk 6–4, 6–3 in the final to capture the title.

Seeds

Draw

Draw

References
 Main Draw

San Luis Potosi Challenger - Doubles
2013 Doubles